Al Rafaah is the name of a settlement in Umm Al Quwain, United Arab Emirates (UAE). It is a popular beach for camping and leisure activities.

References 

Populated places in Umm Al Quwain